Tibor Berczelly (3 January 1912 – 15 October 1990) was a Hungarian sabre and foil fencer. He won three gold and two bronze medals at three Olympic Games.

References

External links
 

1912 births
1990 deaths
Hungarian male foil fencers
Hungarian male sabre fencers
Olympic fencers of Hungary
Fencers at the 1936 Summer Olympics
Fencers at the 1948 Summer Olympics
Fencers at the 1952 Summer Olympics
Olympic gold medalists for Hungary
Olympic bronze medalists for Hungary
Olympic medalists in fencing
Fencers from Budapest
Medalists at the 1936 Summer Olympics
Medalists at the 1948 Summer Olympics
Medalists at the 1952 Summer Olympics